Samuel Edwards (March 12, 1785 – November 21, 1850) was an American politician from Pennsylvania who served as a member of the U.S. House of Representatives from Pennsylvania's 1st congressional district from 1819 to 1823 and from Pennsylvania's 4th congressional district from 1823 to 1827.

Early life
Samuel Edwards was born in Chester Township, Pennsylvania. He studied law, was admitted to the Delaware County bar in 1806 and commenced practice in Chester, Pennsylvania.

Edwards was originally a Federalist and was chairman of the 1812 meeting in Chester, Pennsylvania that denounced Congress for declaring war on Great Britain.  However once the war was on he supported the U.S. effort.  In  April 1813, he and Thomas D. Anderson applied to the state and provided their personal funds as bond for military provisions and ammunition to arm a company of Soldiers from Chester during the War of 1812.  The military provisions were sent to the Battle of Frenchtown to help fight the attack by British Admiral George Cockburn.  The Chester troops marched to Elkton, Maryland to resist the British Forces.

In the summer of 1814, when Dr. Samuel Anderson raised the Mifflin Guards, Edwards joined as a private and served as company clerk.

Career
While still in active service, Edwards was elected as a member of the Pennsylvania House of Representatives from 1814 to 1816.

In 1819, Edwards was elected as a Federalist to the Sixteenth and Seventeenth Congresses and served until 1823.  Edwards gradually fell away from the Federalist party.  He trained under the leadership of Henry Clay but did not follow him into the Whig Party.

In 1825 Edwards was elected as a Jackson Federalist to the Eighteenth Congress from Pennsylvania's 4th congressional district and reelected as a Jacksonian to the Nineteenth Congress.  He served as chairman of the United States House Committee on Expenditures in the Department of Navy during the Seventeenth and Eighteenth Congresses.

After leaving Congress in 1827, Edwards resumed the practice of law in Chester, Pennsylvania.  In 1832, he was elected Chief Burgess of Chester and served as Inspector of Customs in Chester from 1838 to 1842.

He was a director of the Delaware County National Bank and the Delaware Mutual Insurance Company.  He also served as counsel for the Philadelphia, Wilmington and Baltimore Railroad.

Personal life
Edwards daughter married the General and frontiersman Edward Fitzgerald Beale and his granddaughter married the last Czarist Russian Ambassador to the United States, George Bakhmeteff.

He died in Chester in 1850 and is interred in Chester Rural Cemetery.

References

Sources

The Political Graveyard

1785 births
1850 deaths
19th-century American politicians
American bankers
American people of the War of 1812
Burials at Chester Rural Cemetery
Federalist Party members of the United States House of Representatives
Jacksonian members of the United States House of Representatives from Pennsylvania
Members of the Pennsylvania House of Representatives
Pennsylvania Federalists
Pennsylvania lawyers
People from Chester, Pennsylvania
People from Delaware County, Pennsylvania